William Gatacre (by 1499 – 22 December 1577) was an English politician.

He was a Member (MP) of the Parliament of England for Shropshire in November 1554.

References

15th-century births
1577 deaths
English MPs 1554–1555